Cheshmeh Gol and Cheshmeh-ye Gol may refer to:
 Cheshmeh Gol, Fars
 Cheshmeh Gol, Torbat-e Jam, Razavi Khorasan Province
 Cheshmeh-ye Gol, Salehabad, Razavi Khorasan Province
 Cheshmeh Gol, West Azerbaijan

See also
 Gol Cheshmeh (disambiguation)